Socialist Rebirth (Risorgimento Socialista, abbr. RS) is a socialist political party in Italy.

History 
Socialist Rebirth was founded in 2015 as a party with a clear socialist and anti-liberal stamp.

On the occasion of the 2018 general elections, the party joined the Power to the People list, together with Communist Refoundation Party, Italian Communist Party, and other far-left parties and associations, under the leadership of Viola Carofalo. However, Power to the People scored 1.1% of the vote and elected no MPs.

In 2022, RS joined People's Union, the electoral list (which brings together Democracy and Autonomy, Communist Refoundation Party and Power to the People) created by Luigi de Magistris to participate in the general elections of the same year. On this occasion, the party's leader Franco Bartolomei is a candidate for the Senate in the single-member constituency "BAT–Murgia", in Apulia.

Elections results

Italian parliament

Leadership 
President: Alberto Benzoni
Coordinator: Franco Bartolomei

References

External links 

2015 establishments in Italy
Autonomism
Left-wing politics in Italy
Far-left politics in Italy
Marxist parties
Socialist parties in Italy
Eurosceptic parties in Italy